Sanjay Mehrotra is an Indian-American business executive and the CEO of Micron Technology. He was a co-founder of SanDisk, where he served as president and CEO until its acquisition by Western Digital in 2016.

Early life and education 
Mehrotra was born in Kanpur, India, the youngest of four siblings.  His father was a liaison officer in the cotton industry, who later moved the family to New Delhi when Mehrotra was 10 years old. At an early age, Mehrotra began expressing interest in math and science, and he has since said that his father and siblings played a significant role in encouraging him to pursue an education in STEM. As a teenager, he began taking mechanical courses in school and eventually transferred over to Sardar Patel Vidyalaya, a top-ranking high school in New Delhi.

Mehrotra has said that it was his father’s dream to see him continue his education in the U.S., so he committed himself to applying to American universities. At the age of 18, Mehrotra moved to the U.S., transferring from BITS Pilani to attend the University of California, Berkeley, where he earned his bachelor’s degree and master’s degree in Electrical Engineering and Computer Science. He completed his master’s degree by the age of 21.

He graduated in 2009 from Stanford University Graduate School of Business Executive Education Program.

Boise State University awarded an honorary doctorate to Mehrotra at the university's 110th commencement ceremony in 2022. During the ceremony, Mehrotra gave the keynote commencement address.

In 2022, the National Academy of Engineering elected Mehrotra as a member for his contributions to nonvolatile memory design and architecture enabling multilevel cell NAND flash products.

Mehrotra holds more than 70 patents. He has published articles in the area of non-volatile memory design and flash memory systems.

SanDisk 
Mehrotra co-founded SanDisk in 1988 and served as president and CEO from 2011 until 2016. He previously served as executive vice president and chief operating officer, senior vice president of engineering, vice president of product development and director of memory design and product engineering.

He has more than 30 years of experience in the non-volatile semiconductor memory industry, including engineering and management positions at SanDisk, Micron, Integrated Device Technology, SEEQ Technology, Intel, and Atmel.

Micron 
Following the announcement of Mark Durcan's retirement in February 2017, Mehrotra was named chief executive officer. His appointment became effective May 8, 2017, with Durcan serving as an adviser to the company until early August 2017.

While CEO at Micron, Mehrotra was appointed 2019 chairman of the Semiconductor Industry Association, the primary advocacy organization for the U.S. semiconductor industry.

Awards 
Mehrotra has received the following awards and honors:
 
 "IEEE Reynold B. Johnson Data Storage Device Technology Award" (with SanDisk co-founders Ei Harari and Jack Yuan) for "leadership in the development and commercialization of Flash electrically erasable programmable read-only memory-based data storage products", 2006.
 "CEO of the Year" from the Entrepreneur's Foundation of Silicon Valley in recognition of his leadership in advancing SanDisk's community service activities, December 10, 2013.
 "Distinguished Alumni Award in Electrical Engineering" from the University of California, Berkeley, 2013.
 "Distinguished Lifetime Achievement Award" from the Chinese Institute of Engineers USA at the 13th annual Asian American Engineer of the Year Award ceremony March 1, 2014.
 Mehrotra was honored by the American India Foundation for "personal philanthropic efforts and for leading SanDisk's programs to advance educational opportunities for young people from disadvantaged backgrounds, March 21, 2015.
 "Philanthropic CEO of the Year" from the American Red Cross Silicon Valley for his "remarkable impact toward fulfilling [the] mission to prevent and alleviate human suffering locally, nationally and internationally," October 24, 2015.
 2019 Flash Memory Summit Lifetime Achievement Award for “co-founding SanDisk, advancing the architecture that enabled the industry and market for flash memory, and leadership of Micron Technology, Inc. and the Semiconductor Industry Association.” 
 Malaysian Order of Loyal Defender of the State medal, 2021.
 University of California, Berkeley "Spirit of 1868 Volunteer Award," 2021. 
 Mehrotra was inducted into the National Academy of Engineering in 2022, one of the highest distinctions in the profession.

Activities 

On April 18, 2014, Mehrotra along with Shankar Sastry, Dean and Carlson Professor of Engineering at UC Berkeley, opened the SanDisk Computing Lab College of Engineering at the University of California, Berkeley. The lab was funded by a $1 million donation by SanDisk to the College of Engineering. The donation also funded recently completed renovations to Cory Hall, home of the College's Department of Electrical Engineering and Computer Sciences.

Mehrotra currently serves on the board of directors for Micron Technology, CDW, Stanford Health Care, Semiconductor Industry Association, and the Engineering Advisory Board at the University of California, Berkeley.

References

External links 
 Executive Profile, Sanjay Mehrotra

Living people
American chief executives of Fortune 500 companies
SanDisk
Western Digital people
UC Berkeley College of Engineering alumni
American technology chief executives
20th-century American businesspeople
21st-century American businesspeople
Indian emigrants to the United States
American people of Indian descent
Micron Technology people
American computer businesspeople
American chief executives
Chief executives in the technology industry
1958 births